

Argentina
San Carlos de Bolívar, Buenos Aires Province

Australia
A suburb of Adelaide, South Australia is named in honor of him

Belgium
Boulevard Simon Bolívar, a street in Brussels
Bolivarplaats, a square in Antwerp
Statue of Simon Bolívar "El Libertador" in front of the Brussels-North railway station in Brussels

Bolivia
Bolivia is named after Simón Bolívar
Bolívar Province, Cochabamba
Bolívar, Cochabamba
Villa Simón Bolívar, a small town
Club Bolívar, a football team who play at the Estadio Libertador Simón Bolívar
Copa Simón Bolívar, a football competition

Bulgaria
 Simón Bolívar secondary school in Plovdiv, opened on 1983 in honor of the 200th anniversary of his birth
Statue of Simón Bolívar in Sofia opened in 2010 in honor of the 200th anniversary of the independence of the Bolivarian Republic of Venezuela

Chile
Simón Bolívar metro station (Santiago), Chile

Colombia
Bolívar Department
El Carmen de Bolívar
Bolívar, Cauca
Bolívar, Santander
Bolívar, Valle del Cauca
Ciudad Bolívar, Bogotá
Ciudad Bolívar, Antioquia
Bolívar Park (Medellín, Colombia)
Carrera Bolívar, Medellín
Simón Bolívar International Airport (Colombia), serving Santa Marta city
Puerto Bolívar Airport, a private airport in La Guajira Department of Colombia
 Simón Bolívar Park, Bogotá
Plaza Bolívar, Bogotá
Pico Simón Bolívar, at the Sierra Nevada de Santa Marta
Simón Bolívar (TransMilenio), a bus station in Bogotá, Colombia
Bolívar (TV series), a 2019 historical drama television series

Costa Rica
Parque Zoológico Nacional Simón Bolívar, in San José, Costa Rica

Cuba
Bolívar (cigar brand)

Ecuador
Bolívar Province (Ecuador)
Puerto Bolívar, a port
José Joaquín de Olmedo International Airport, formerly Simón Bolívar International Airport, Guayaquil, Ecuador

El Salvador
Bolívar, a town La Unión province

France
Avenue Simon Bolívar, an avenue in Paris.
Equestrian Statue of Simón Bolívar, just a few steps away from the Eiffel Tower and the Seine, in Paris. It was built by major French sculptor Emmanuel Frémiet, famous for his Jeanne d'Arc golden statue in Paris. Frémiet sculpted it for Bogota, Colombia in 1910 before the latter offered it in 1930 to Paris for the 100th anniversary of Bolívar's death.The statue was originally at the Place de la Porte-de-Champerret, but was moved to its present location (the Cours la Reine) in 1980. 
Bolivar (Paris Métro), a station.
Rue Simon Bolivar, in Goussainville, near Paris and the Charles de Gaulle Airport.

Germany
Simon Bolívar Anlage, a street in Frankfurt

Hungary
A park and a walkway in Budapest are named after him

India
Simon Bolivar Marg, a street in Chanakyapuri, New Delhi.
Simon Bolivar Square, a road intersection in Chanakyapuri, New Delhi.

Iran
Simon Bolivar Boulevard, in Tehran

Italy
Piazza Simone Bolivar, in Milan
Piazza Bolivar, in Noto
Parco Simon Bolivar, in Roma Monte Sacro

Jamaica
Simón Bolívar Cultural Centre, Kingston, Jamaica
Simon Bolivar - Cluster 2, Rex Nettleford Hall of Residence, The University of the West Indies Mona

Mexico
General Simón Bolívar Municipality and its municipal seat, General Simón Bolívar
Instituto Simón Bolívar, a private school in Xoco, Benito Juárez, Mexico City
Colegio Simón Bolívar (Simon Bolivar University), a school in Colonia Insurgentes, Mixcoac, Benito Juárez, Mexico City
Colegio La Salle Simón Bolívar, a private school system in Mexico City
Simón Bolívar (1942 film), a Mexican film
Simón Bolívar metro station (Monterrey), on Simón Bolivar Avenue

Paraguay
Simón Bolívar District, Paraguay

Peru
Bolívar District, Bolívar
Bolívar, Peru, the capital of Bolívar District
Bolívar Province, Peru, in La Libertad Region
Simón Bolívar (Tadolini), three statues, one of which is in Lima

Spain
 Avenida Simón Bolívar, a street in Málaga
Simón Bolívar (1969 film), a Spanish film

Switzerland
Statue of Simón Bolívar in Bern along the Universal Postal Union

Turkey
Simon Bolivar Bulvarı, a street in Ankara

United Kingdom
Statue of Simón Bolívar, London 
Simón Bolívar Professor of Latin-American Studies at Cambridge University
 Bolivar Terrace in Glasgow,Scotland is named after Simon Bolivar and there is a commemorative plaque on the wall of one of the buildings.

United States
Bolivar, Alabama
Simón Bolívar (Tadolini), three statues, one of which is in United Nations Plaza in San Francisco, California
Bolivar, Georgia
Bolivar, Indiana
Bolivar Township, Benton County, Indiana
New Orleans, Simon Bolivar Blvd, Statue
Bolivar County, Mississippi
Bolivar, Missouri with their high school namesake The Liberator
Bolivar, New York
Bolivar (village), New York
Bolivar, Ohio
Bolivar Road in Cleveland, Ohio. Coincidentally this street is adjacent to the Cleveland Guardians ballpark, (formerly the Cleveland Indians), franchise where many great Venezuelan shortstops have played.
Mount Bolivar, Oregon, a high point in Oregon
Bolivar, Pennsylvania
Bolivar, Tennessee
Bolivar, Texas
Statue of Simón Bolívar (Houston), Texas
Bolivar Peninsula, Texas
Equestrian statue of Simón Bolívar (Washington, D.C.)
Bolivar, West Virginia
, a nuclear submarine
Bolivar House, Center of Latin American Studies, Stanford University
Simon Bolivar st. In New Orleans, Louisiana.

Uruguay
Bolívar, Montevideo
Bolívar, Uruguay

Venezuela
The Bolivarian Republic of Venezuela, the official long name of Venezuela
Bolívar (state)
Ciudad Bolívar, capital of Bolívar State
several municipalities: see Simón Bolívar Municipality (disambiguation) or Bolívar Municipality (disambiguation)
many towns and cities in Venezuela have a Plaza Bolivar: see Plaza Bolivar (disambiguation)
Simón Bolívar International Bridge on the Venezuela–Colombia border
Simón Bolívar (Tadolini), three statues, one of which is in Caracas
 Guri Dam, or the Simón Bolívar Hydroelectric Plant, in Bolívar State, Venezuela, on the Caroni River
Teatro Simón Bolívar, a theatre in Caracas
Venezuelan bolívar, the currency of Venezuela
Pico Bolívar, highest peak in Venezuela
Simón Bolívar International Airport (Venezuela), serving the capital city of Venezuela, Caracas
Simón Bolívar University in Caracas, Venezuela
Centro Simón Bolívar Towers, two 26-story twin towers located in Caracas, Venezuela
Simón Bolívar United World College of Agriculture
Venesat-1 "Simón Bolívar", a satellite launched in 2008
Orquesta Sinfónica Simón Bolívar, an orchestra
Simón Bolívar (barque) of the Venezuelan Navy
Copa Simón Bolívar (Venezuela), a football competition
Estadio de Fútbol de la Universidad Simón Bolívar in Caracas

Other uses
Various streets in Milwaukee, New Orleans, Mexico City, Mexico, Santiago de Chile, Managua, Tehran, Ankara, Turkey, Cairo, Paris, Guatemala City and New Delhi are named after Simón Bolívar
International Simón Bolívar Prize

"El Libertador"
Bolivar is often referred to as "El Libertador" (The liberator), and a number of places bear this title in his honour. In the southern part of South America "El Libertador" may refer to José de San Martín.
 A number of Venezuelan municipalities are named Libertador Municipality: see Libertador Municipality (disambiguation)
 Puerto Libertador, Colombia
 Order of the Liberator, formerly the highest distinction of Venezuela

People with the name
Orindatus Simon Bolivar Wall (1825–1891), the first black man to be commissioned as captain in the Regular U.S. Army
Simon Bolivar Buckner (1823–1914), American soldier and politician
Simon Bolivar Buckner Jr. (1886–1945), American lieutenant general during World War II

See also

References

Simón Bolívar
Lists of places named after people
Bolivar